Melgar may refer to:

Places and locations

Colombia
Melgar, Tolima

Peru
Melgar Province
Mariano Melgar District

Spain
Melgar de Abajo
Melgar de Fernamental

People 

 Mariano Melgar (1791-1815), Peruvian poet
 Francisco Melgar (1849-1926), Spanish politician
 John Melgar Smith (1872-1947), American businessman and politician
 Rafael Lapesa Melgar (1908–2001), Spanish philologist
 José Milton Melgar (born 1959), retired professional Bolivian football player
 Fernand Melgar (born 1961), Swiss film director and actor

Sports
FBC Melgar